Eupithecia gomerensis is a moth in the  family Geometridae. It is found on the Canary Islands.

The wingspan is 17–19 mm.

Subspecies
Eupithecia gomerensis gomerensis
Eupithecia gomerensis leucophaeata Pinker, 1969

References

Moths described in 1917
gomerensis
Moths of Africa